This is a list of areas in Bengaluru Pete, a 2.24 km2 market area in Bengaluru, India. Bengaluru Pete was established by Kempegowda I in the 16th century, with different areas in the Pete named after the respective trade activities that took place or the communities that lived here. The two main areas were Chikkapete and Doddapete, run from west to east and north to south respectively.

See also
 Peths in Pune

References

History of Bangalore